Saint Philomena School is a private Catholic grammar school in Portsmouth, Rhode Island. The school has been designated a Blue Ribbon School of Excellence by the United States Department of Education. It is a member of the Sacred Heart Schools organization.

History
Saint Philomena School was founded in 1953 by the Sisters Faithful Companions of Jesus, and today boasts a student body of approximately 480.  The school was originally located in a single building on the Narragansett Bay, but has grown over the years into a campus of five buildings, including a free-standing auditorium and a new, state-of-the-art classroom building.

Admissions
Admission is by application only, and each grade has fifty students or less.  Tuition is $6,800 per year for grades K-5 and $8,250 for grades 6–8.  Scholarships are available from the school and through the Roman Catholic Diocese of Providence.

Student body
Students come primarily from Aquidneck Island, Southeastern Massachusetts, and other parts of Rhode Island.  Graduates of St. Philomena's go on to attend private and public high schools in Rhode Island and nearby Massachusetts, including the Portsmouth Abbey School, Bishop Connolly High School, Bishop Stang High School, St. George's School, the Wheeler School, and Moses Brown School, amongst many others.

References

External links

Diocese of Providence Catholic Schools 
Diocese of Providence Blue Ribbon Schools

Private elementary schools in Rhode Island
Private middle schools in Rhode Island
Buildings and structures in Portsmouth, Rhode Island
Schools in Newport County, Rhode Island
Educational institutions established in 1953
1953 establishments in Rhode Island